Statistics of Veikkausliiga in the 1999 season.

Overview
It was contested by 12 teams, and Haka Valkeakoski won the championship.

Preliminary stage

Table

Results

Final stage

Championship group

Table

Results

Relegation group

Table

Results

See also
Suomen Cup 1999

References
Finland - List of final tables (RSSSF)

Veikkausliiga seasons
Fin
Fin
1